Atheta is a genus of rove beetles in the family Staphylinidae. There are more than 640 described species in Atheta.

See also
 List of Atheta species

References

Further reading

External links

 

Aleocharinae
Articles created by Qbugbot